Azhdahatu (also Romanized as Azhdahātū and Azhdehātū; also known as Adzhdikhatu, Āzdehsū, and Azhdasu) is a village in Mojezat Rural District of the Central District of Zanjan County, Zanjan province, Iran. At the 2006 National Census, its population was 1,276 in 364 households. The following census in 2011 counted 1,407 people in 453 households. The latest census in 2016 showed a population of 1,276 people in 421 households; it was the largest village in its rural district.

References 

Zanjan County

Populated places in Zanjan Province

Populated places in Zanjan County